Alan Vega is the first studio album of Alan Vega, released in 1980 by PVC Records.

Accolades

Track listing

Personnel
Adapted from the Alan Vega liner notes.

Musicians
 Phil Hawk – guitar
 Alan Vega – vocals, production

Production and additional personnel
 Curtis Knapp – cover art
 David Lichtenstein – engineering

Release history

References

External links 
 

1980 debut albums
Alan Vega albums
Celluloid Records albums
ZE Records albums